Facundo Matias Barboza (born 31 July 1996) is an Argentine professional footballer who plays as a midfielder for Argentinos Juniors.

Career
Barboza's career began with Argentinos Juniors in 2016, making his debut on 6 February in a league draw with Tigre. Three further appearances followed as Argentinos were relegated to Primera B Nacional. In Argentina's second tier, Barboza made thirty-two appearances and scored three goals; his first came against Douglas Haig in October 2016. Argentinos won the 2016–17 Primera B Nacional title, gaining an instant return to the Primera División. Barboza joined Godoy Cruz on loan on 28 January 2019. Twelve appearances followed, which included a Copa Libertadores debut versus Universidad de Concepción.

In January 2020, Barboza switched Argentina for Mexico as he was loaned to Ascenso MX side Zacatepec. He would appear four times, though just once as a starter; against Correcaminos UAT on 14 March.

Career statistics
.

Honours
Argentinos Juniors
Primera B Nacional: 2016–17

References

External links

1996 births
Living people
People from San Fernando de la Buena Vista
Argentine footballers
Association football midfielders
Argentine expatriate footballers
Expatriate footballers in Mexico
Argentine expatriate sportspeople in Mexico
Argentine Primera División players
Primera Nacional players
Ascenso MX players
Argentinos Juniors footballers
Godoy Cruz Antonio Tomba footballers
Club Atlético Zacatepec players
Sportspeople from Buenos Aires Province